Grumman could mean:

Companies
 Grumman, a former aircraft maker, now part of Northrop Grumman
 Northrop Grumman, an aerospace and defense conglomerate

People
 Leroy Grumman (1895–1982), an American industrialist and aeronautical engineer, who founder of the Grumman Aircraft Engineering Corporation

Ships
USNS Leroy Grumman (T-AO-195), a U.S. Navy fleet replenishment oiler in service since 1989

Fiction
 Grumman (Dune), a fictional planet in Frank Herbert's Dune universe
 Stanislaus Grumman, a fictional character in the His Dark Materials series